Olearia asterotricha, commonly known as rough daisy-bush, is a species of flowering plant in the family Asteraceae. A tall shrub with white, mauve or blue daisy like flowers growing from the Blue Mountains in New South Wales to western Victoria, Australia.

Description
The branchlets are covered with densely matted woolly hairs, star-shaped hairs or a combination of both. It has white, pale mauve or blue daisy like flowers with a yellow or purplish centre. The bracts have fine short matted hairs and arranged in rows of 1-3. The dark green leaves are arranged alternately, sometimes with a very small stalk or without a stalk. The underside of leaves is densely woolly, leaf margins are entire or toothed and rolled under. Fruit are smooth to sparsely covered with matted hairs. It contains a dry single seed that does not open on maturity.

Taxonomy and naming
Rough daisy bush was first described in 1859 by Ferdinand von Mueller as Eurybia asterotricha and published in Fragmenta Phytographiae Australiae.  In 1865 Mueller changed the name to Aster asterotrichus and in 1867  English botanist George Bentham changed the name to Olearia asterotricha in Flora Australiensis. The specific epithet (asterotricha) is derived from the ancient Greek words aster meaning "a star" and thrix, trichos meaning "hair".

In 2014, Andre Messina described four subspecies in Australian Systematic Botany and the names are accepted at the Australian Plant Census:  
  Olearia asterotricha subsp. glaucophylla - has bluish leaves, lobed edges from about halfway to apex and very small white protuberance at the leaf base;

Distribution and habitat
Rough daisy bush grows from the Blue Mountains, New South Wales to western Victoria where it grows mostly in cool damp acidic soils, heath, or dry sclerophyll forest. The species may vary depending on geographic region.  In the Sydney region it is a compact shrub with white flowers and grey-green foliage. The Victorian form has mauve-blue flowers, green leaves and a more open form. Considered rare in Victoria.
  Olearia asterotricha  subsp. asterotricha is only found at elevated sites in the Grampians National Park growing on sandy soils in heath woodlands.
  Olearia asterotricha subsp. lobata grows in wet heathland or in moist forest usually found at lower altitudes. Also found in a few disjunct areas of southern Victoria  but usually uncommon.
  Olearia asterotricha subsp. rotundifolia is believed to be restricted to a single population directly below the summit of Mt Langi Ghiran, Victoria. Growing in damp situations on southern slopes around granite boulders.

References

Asterales of Australia
Flora of New South Wales
Flora of Victoria (Australia)
asterotricha
Plants described in 1859
Taxa named by Ferdinand von Mueller